Nicholas the Pilgrim (1075 – 2 June 1094), sometimes Nicholas of Trani, is a saint of the Roman Catholic Church.

He was born at Steiri in Boeotia, Greece, where his solitary life as a shepherd led him to contemplative spirituality, as part of which he developed the constant repetition of the phrase Kyrie Eleison. This brought him conflict and aggression in populated places, and he suffered much oppression.

He died while on pilgrimage in Apulia, where he is venerated particularly in Trani. Trani Cathedral is dedicated to him, and he is the patron saint of the city.

His feast day is 2 June. The annual procession through Trani in his honour is held in the last week of July. In Orthodox tradition he is regarded as a Fool for Christ.

References

External links
Santiebeati.it: San Nicola il Pellegrino 
Traniviva.it (official portal of the municipality of Trani): account of Saint Nicholas of Trani

Sources
Cioffari, Gerardo, 1994: San Nicola Pellegrino. Levante editore
Archdiocese of Trani, Barletta, Bisceglie and Nazareth (publ.), 2004: San Nicola il Pellegrino: Atti, testimonianze e liturgie in occasione dei festeggiamenti del IX centenario della sua morte. 10 anni dopo. Trani

1075 births
1094 deaths
11th-century Byzantine people
11th-century Christian saints
Medieval Italian saints
People from Boeotia
People from Trani
Saints of medieval Greece
Shepherds
Yurodivy
Miracle workers